The 1957 NCAA University Division football season saw two different national champions. Auburn was ranked first in the AP writers' poll taken at season's end, while Ohio State was first in the UPI coaches' poll. Auburn was ineligible for a bowl game, however, having been placed on probation indefinitely by the Southeastern Conference, after having paid two high school players $500 apiece. 

During the 20th century, the NCAA had no playoff for the major college football teams in the University Division, later known as Division I-A. The NCAA did recognize a national champion based upon the final results of "wire service" (AP and UPI) polls. The extent of that recognition came in the form of acknowledgment in the annual NCAA Football Guide of the "unofficial" national champions. The AP poll in 1957 consisted of the votes of as many as 360 sportswriters. The UPI poll was taken of a panel of 35 coaches.  In both cases, the voters would give their opinion of the ten best teams, and under a point system of 10 points for first place, 9 for second, etc., the "overall" ranking was determined. The top teams played on New Year's Day in the four major postseason bowl games: the Rose Bowl (near Los Angeles at Pasadena), the Sugar Bowl (New Orleans), the Orange Bowl (Miami), and the Cotton Bowl Classic (Dallas).

Conference and program changes

Conference changes
One conference began play in 1957:
Gulf Coast Athletic Conference – active through the 1963 season
One conference played its final season in 1957:
Central Church College Conference – conference active since the 1951 season

Membership changes

September 

In the preseason poll released on September 16, the defending champion Sooners of the University of Oklahoma—who had won 40 consecutive games dating back to 1953—were the first place choice for 127 of 174 writers casting votes, followed by Texas A&M, Michigan State, Minnesota, and Tennessee. As the regular season progressed, a new poll would be issued on the Monday following the weekend's games.

September 20 - Abner Haynes and Leon King suited up for  North Texas State College against  Texas Western at Kidd Field in El Paso, marking the first time a major college football team based in Texas fielded African-American players. King scored a 33 yard touchdown, while Haynes had a long touchdown run called back "despite never stepping out of bounds and the whistle not blowing until he crossed the goal line." Texas Western escaped with a 14–13 win.

September 20–21 -  The U.S. Air Force Academy, founded two years earlier played its first major college schedule in 1957. The Falcons made their debut at UCLA on Friday night and lost 47–0. They would finish their first season 3–6–1, but were undefeated the following year. On Saturday, No. 1 Oklahoma won at No. 8 Pittsburgh 26–0, breaking the all-time record for consecutive wins. No. 2 Texas A&M beat Maryland 21–13 in a game at Dallas. No. 3 Michigan State, No. 4 Minnesota, and No. 5 Tennessee had not yet begun their seasons. No. 11 Georgia Tech beat Kentucky 13–0 and rose to third, while No. 12 Navy won 46–6 at Boston College and rose to fifth. The first AP poll was No. 1 Oklahoma, No. 2 Texas A&M, No. 3 Georgia Tech, No. 4 Michigan State, and No. 5 Navy.

September 28 - No. 1 Oklahoma was idle. No. 2 Texas A&M won at Texas Tech 21–0 and No. 3 Georgia Tech played to a scoreless tie with No. 15 SMU. No. 4 Michigan State beat Indiana 54–0. No. 5 Navy beat visiting William & Mary 33–6. No. 6 Minnesota, which beat Washington 46–7, and No. 7 Duke, which had beaten Virginia 40–0, rose into the top five. The next poll was No. 1 Oklahoma, No. 2 Michigan State, No. 3 Minnesota, No. 4 Duke, and No. 5 Texas A&M.

October 

October 5 - No. 1 Oklahoma beat Iowa State 40–14. No. 2 Michigan State won at California 19–0. No. 3 Minnesota beat visiting Purdue 21–17, No. 4 Duke beat Maryland 14–0, and No. 5 Texas A&M won at Missouri 28–0. The next poll was No. 1 Oklahoma, No. 2 Michigan State, No. 3 Texas A&M, No. 4 Minnesota, and No. 5 Duke.

October 12 - A crowd of 75,504 watched in Dallas as No. 1 Oklahoma had a difficult time with unranked Texas; the Longhorns picked off four passes and the score was 7–7 at the half before the Sooners preserved their winning streak 21–7 in a game that wasn't pretty. At the same time, No. 2 Michigan State won 35–6 at No. 6 Michigan, leading the AP voters to re-evaluate. No. 3 Texas A&M won 28–6 over Houston. No. 4 Minnesota won 41–6 at Northwestern. No. 5 Duke narrowly beat No. 15 Rice in Houston, 7–6. The Spartans took over the top spot in the next poll: No. 1 Michigan State, No. 2 Oklahoma, No. 3 Texas A&M, No. 4 Minnesota, and No. 5 Duke.

October 19 - No. 1 Michigan State lost 20–13 to Purdue and fell out of the top five, while No. 2 Oklahoma beat Kansas 47–0 and reclaimed the top spot. No. 3 Texas A&M won 7–0 at TCU and No. 4 Minnesota lost at Illinois 34–14. No. 5 Duke beat Wake Forest 34–7, and No. 6 Iowa beat No. 13 Wisconsin 21–7, while No. 9 Auburn beat Georgia Tech 3–0 in Atlanta and rose to fifth place in the polls. The next poll: No. 1 Oklahoma, No. 2 Texas A&M, No. 3 Iowa, No. 4 Duke, and No. 5 Auburn.

October 26 - No. 1 Oklahoma edged Colorado 14–13, and lost the top spot again, despite being 5–0. No. 2 Texas A&M beat Baylor 14–0 and replaced the Sooners in the next poll. No. 3 Iowa won 6–0 at Northwestern and rose to third. No. 4 Duke went to neighboring Raleigh to play No. 11 North Carolina State and ended with a 14–14 tie. No. 5 Auburn won at Houston 48–7. No. 7 Notre Dame beat Pittsburgh 13–7 and rose to fifth. The next poll: No. 1 Texas A&M, No. 2 Oklahoma, No. 3 Iowa, No. 4 Auburn, and No. 5 Notre Dame.

November 
November 2 - No. 1 Texas A&M got past No. 11 Arkansas 7–6 in Fayetteville, and No. 2 Oklahoma won at Kansas State 13–0. No. 3 Iowa played No. 12 Michigan to a 21–21 tie, and No. 4 Auburn beat No. 19 Florida 13–0.  No. 5 Notre Dame lost 20–6 to visiting No. 16 Navy, and No. 6 Michigan State won 21–7 at Wisconsin to rise into the top five. The next poll: No. 1 Texas A&M, No. 2 Oklahoma, No. 3 Auburn, No. 4 Michigan State, and No. 5 Iowa.

November 9 - No. 1 Texas A&M beat SMU 19–6 and No. 2 Oklahoma won at Missouri 39–14. No. 3 Auburn beat No. 17 Mississippi State 15–7 in Birmingham, No. 4 Michigan State beat No. 15 Notre Dame 34–6, and No. 5 Iowa beat Minnesota 44–20. The poll remained unchanged.

November 16 - No. 1 Texas A&M lost 7–6 to No. 20 Rice in Houston. No. 2 Oklahoma had won a record 47 consecutive games when they hosted Notre Dame. The Irish, 4–2 and on a losing streak, were an 18–point underdog coming into Norman. The Sooners, who had scored in 123 consecutive games dating back to 1945, were unable to reach the end zone, but had held off the Irish on two goal line stands. In the final minutes, Notre Dame was on the 3–yard line on fourth down, when Dick Lynch "crossed up the Sooners" and ran around right end for a touchdown. Oklahoma's desperate passing drive at game's end was stopped by a Notre Dame interception, and the crowd of 62,000 was stunned into silence... and then stood up and applauded for both the Sooners and the Irish. Oklahoma's previous defeat, more than four years earlier, had been at the hands of Notre Dame as well. Final score: Notre Dame 7, Oklahoma 0. No. 3 Auburn beat Georgia 6–0 at Columbus, Georgia while No. 4 Michigan State beat Minnesota 42–13. No. 5 Iowa lost 17–13 at No. 6 Ohio State; the 7–1 Buckeyes rose to third, while the 6–1–1 Hawkeyes fell to eighth. No. 8 Mississippi, which beat No. 7 Tennessee 14–7 in Memphis, rose to fifth. The next poll: No. 1 Michigan State, No. 2 Auburn, No. 3 Ohio State, No. 4 Texas A&M, and No. 5 Mississippi.

November 23 - No. 1 Michigan State closed its season with a 27–0 win over Kansas State, but fell to third. No. 2 Auburn won at Florida State 29–7. As the only unbeaten (9–0) school among the majors, Auburn was voted No. 1 in the AP poll. No. 3 Ohio State wrapped up its season with a win 31–14 at No. 19 Michigan and was first in the UPI poll. No. 4 Texas A&M and No. 5 Mississippi were idle, while No. 6 Oklahoma won 53–6 at Nebraska and returned to the top five. The poll: No. 1 Auburn, No. 2 Ohio State, No. 3 Michigan State, No. 4 Texas A&M, and No. 5 Oklahoma.

November 28–30 - Thanksgiving Day saw Bear Bryant's No. 4 Texas A&M team lose 9–7 to Texas. On Saturday, No. 1 Auburn shut out rival Alabama 40–0 at their annual meeting in Birmingham to close its season 10–0, while the Crimson Tide finished at 2–7–1. Bryant, who had transformed the Aggies from a 1–9 team in 1953 to a contender (Texas A&M was undefeated in 1956, and their two losses in 1957 were by a total of three points), would accept the job as head coach at his alma mater Alabama at season's end. No. 2 Ohio State and No. 3 Michigan State were both 8–1 in the regular season, but Ohio State was 7–0 in Big Ten play, compared to the 5–1 Spartans, and got the Rose Bowl bid against unranked Oregon. No. 5 Oklahoma beat Oklahoma State 53–6 and prepared for the Orange Bowl. No. 8 Navy, which won the Army-Navy game 14–0 in Philadelphia, finished with an 8–1–1 record, a bid to meet SWC champion Rice in the Cotton Bowl, and a fifth-place finish in the final poll.

The services were split as to the national champion. The AP Trophy went to Auburn, the choice of a majority of writers for No. 1, and the only major college program to finish unbeaten (Arizona State, then a lesser power, also finished 10–0). Auburn, however, was on probation and was ineligible for a bowl (conference runner-up Mississippi received the SEC's automatic slot in the Sugar Bowl), and the UPI coaches poll awarded No. 1 to the Ohio State Buckeyes (8–1). Both Auburn and Ohio State are recognized in the NCAA Football Guidebook as unofficial national champions for 1957. The final AP poll was: No. 1 Auburn, No. 2 Ohio State, No. 3 Michigan State, No. 4 Oklahoma, and No. 5 Navy, while the UPI poll was No. 1 Ohio State, No. 2 Auburn, No. 3 Michigan State, No. 4 Oklahoma, and No. 5 Iowa.

Conference standings

Bowl games

Major bowls
Wednesday, January 1, 1958

Other bowls

College Division

Final results 
Six college football teams finished the 1957 season with unbeaten and untied records. The Arizona State Sun Devils, with a 10–0 record, had the greatest point differential among the four teams with 10 wins. The Sun Devils scored 396 points while allowing only 66. Second was Pittsburg of Kansas (320/53) which was an NAIA team, followed by Middle Tennessee State (241/40) and Auburn (207/28). The remaining undefeated teams had fewer than 10 wins. Three undefeated teams each had nine, eight, seven, and six wins.

Heisman Trophy voting
The Heisman Trophy is given to the year's most outstanding player

Source:

See also 
 1957 NCAA University Division football rankings
 1957 College Football All-America Team

References